Kildare Robert Eric Dobbs  (10 October 1923 – 1 April 2013) was a Canadian short story and travel writer.

Born in Meerut, Uttar Pradesh, India, he was educated in Ireland and later spent 5 years in the Royal Navy during the Second World War. After the war he worked in the British Colonial Service in Tanganyika. Dobbs came to Canada in 1952 and became a teacher, editor for Macmillan of Canada, managing editor of Saturday Night, and book editor of The Toronto Star Weekly.

In 2000, he was awarded the Order of Ontario. Dobbs lived in Toronto with his wife, Linda Kooluris Dobbs, a noted portrait artist, painter and photographer. In 2013, shortly before his death at age 89 following a period of ill health, Dobbs received the Order of Canada from the Right Honourable David Johnston, at his home in Toronto. He was cremated and his remains interred in the family grave in St Mary's (Church of Ireland) churchyard in Castlecomer, Co Kilkenny, Ireland.

Bibliography
Running to Paradise – 1962 (winner of the 1962 Governor General's Award for Fiction)
Reading the Time – 1968
Canada 1964 1965
The Great Fur Opera – 1970 (Dobson/McClelland and Stewart)
Pride and Fall: A Novella and Six Stories – 1981 (Clarke, Irwin)
Historic Canada – 1984 (Methuen)
Coastal Canada – 1985
Anatolian Suite: Travels and Discursions in Turkey – 1989 (Little, Brown & Co.)
Ribbon of Highway: By Bus Along the Trans-Canada – 1991 (Little, Brown & Co.)
Smiles and Chukkers & Other Vanities – 1994 (Little, Brown & Co.)
The Eleventh Hour: Poems for the Third Millennium – 1997 (Mosaic)
Casablanca: The Poem – 1999 (Ekstasis Editions)
Running the Rapids:A Writer's Life – 2005 (Dundurn)
"Casanova in Venice: A Raunchy Rhyme"  with nine original wood engravings by Wesley W. Bates- 2010 (Porcupine's Quill)

References

 W. H. New, ed. Encyclopedia of Literature in Canada. Toronto: University of Toronto Press, 2002.

1923 births
2013 deaths
Canadian male short story writers
Members of the Order of Canada
Members of the Order of Ontario
Governor General's Award-winning fiction writers
Place of death missing
20th-century Canadian short story writers
21st-century Canadian short story writers
20th-century Canadian male writers
21st-century Canadian male writers
British people in colonial India
British emigrants to Canada
British expatriates in Tanganyika
Royal Navy personnel of World War II